The term bandstacked applies to an antenna or satellite feedhorn (LNBF) that is designed to operate on two or more bands of frequencies. Usually, a portion of the radio frequency spectrum that has been divided into a low band and a high band.

This example is for a C Band LNBF that operates with two different local oscillator frequencies.

Model Number	B1SAT STACK
I/P Frequency	3.7-4.2 GHz
O/P Frequency	950-2050 MHz
LO Frequency	Lower Band 5.15 GHz, Upper Band 5.75 GHz

One application is to send both H and V signals to the receiver on one cable at the same time.
Other LNBF are voltage switched by the receiver for V or H signal.

·	Extended Frequency 3.7 GHz ~ 4.2 GHz 
·	Bandstacked LNBF

This also can be applied to the design and construction of VHF antennas, typically base station antennas that can cover the VHF low band and high band. 
This should not be confused with stacked antenna array configurations.

Radio technology